Sermitsiaq may refer to:

Sermitsiaq (mountain), on Sermitsiaq Island
Sermitsiaq (newspaper), a Greenlandic newspaper
Sermitsiaq Island, in the Nuup Kangerlua fjord, Greenland
Sermitsiaq Glacier, in western Greenland